Mountain Springs may refer to:

Mountain Springs, Nevada, unincorporated community in Clark County, Nevada
Mountain Springs (Clark County), spring in the Spring Mountains in Clark County, Nevada
Mountain Springs Summit, mountain pass in the Spring Mountains in Clark County, Nevada

See also
Antelope Hot Springs, natural hot springs in southeastern Oregon
Mountain Spring (disambiguation)